Józef Tomasz Rostafiński (14 August 1850 – 5 May 1928) was a Polish botanist.

Life 

One of his books, the Przewodnik do oznaczania roślin w Polsce dziko rosnących (Guide to Wild Plants in Poland), had 21 editions between 1886 and 1979. 
In one of his notable works, Józef Rostafiński did extensive research about the Polesie region in eastern Poland, and claimed it lacked certain type of trees due to the soil and ground. Streets bearing his name can be found in the Polish cities of Kraków, Warsaw, and Wrocław.

References

External links 
Józef Rostafiński's works on Polona

1850 births
1928 deaths
20th-century Polish botanists
19th-century Polish botanists